Marcel Pérès (1898–1974) was a French film actor who acted prolifically during his long career. He was a character actor often playing smaller, supporting roles.

Selected filmography

 Port of Shadows (1938)
 Return at Dawn (1938)
 Women's Prison (1938)
 Ultimatum (1938)
 Crossroads (1938)
 The Phantom Carriage (1939)
 The Emigrant (1940)
 Night in December (1940)
 Radio Surprises (1940)
 The Pavilion Burns (1941)
 Who Killed Santa Claus? (1941)
 The Stairs Without End (1943)
 It Happened at the Inn (1943)
 Goodbye Leonard (1943)
 Children of Paradise (1945)
 The Bellman (1945)
 St. Val's Mystery (1945)
 François Villon (1945)
 Panic (Panique) (1946)
 Lunegarde (1946)
 Raboliot (1946)
 Roger la Honte (1946)
 Monsieur Vincent (1947)
 The Beautiful Trip (1947)
 The Lovers Of Verona (1949)
 Fantomas Against Fantomas (1949)
 The Farm of Seven Sins (1949)
 Justice Is Done (1950)
 Cartouche, King of Paris (1950)
 Two Pennies Worth of Violets (1951)
 Life Is a Game (1951)
 Monsieur Octave (1951)
 Crimson Curtain (1952)
 Alone in the World (1952)
 A Mother's Secret (1952)
 Alarm in Morocco (1953)
 Children of Love (1953)
 The Virtuous Scoundrel (1953)
 Before the Deluge (1954)
 Cadet Rousselle (1954)
 Caroline and the Rebels (1955)
 Gas-Oil (1955)
 The Whole Town Accuses (1956)
 Paris Holiday (1956)
 Blood to the Head (1956)
 I'll Get Back to Kandara (1956)
 Three Days to Live (1957)
 The Enigma of the Folies-Bergere (1959)
 Interpol Against X (1960)
 Women Are Like That (1960)
 Where the Truth Lies (1962)
 Méfiez-vous, mesdames (1963)
 Heaven Sent (1963)
 Les Bricoleurs (1963)
 Your Money or Your Life (1966)
 A Very Curious Girl (1969)
 The Milky Way (1969)
 The Lion's Share (1971)
 The Phantom of Liberty (1974)

References

Bibliography
 Crisp, Colin. French Cinema—A Critical Filmography: Volume 1, 1929-1939. Indiana University Press, 2015.
 Goble, Alan. The Complete Index to Literary Sources in Film. Walter de Gruyter, 1999.
 Neibaur, James L. The Bob Hope Films. McFarland, 2004.

External links

1898 births
1974 deaths
People from Castelsarrasin
French male film actors
French male television actors